The Indian Institute of Science (IISc) is a public, deemed, research university for higher education and research in science, engineering, design, and management. It is located in Bangalore, in the Indian state of Karnataka. The institute was established in 1909 with active support from Jamsetji Tata and thus is also locally known as the "Tata Institute". It is ranked among the most prestigious academic institutions in India and has the highest citation per faculty among all the universities in the world. It was granted the deemed to be university status in 1958 and the Institute of Eminence status in 2018.

History

After an accidental meeting between Jamsetji Tata and Swami Vivekananda, on a ship in 1893 where they discussed Tata's plan of bringing the steel industry to India, Tata wrote to Vivekananda five years later: "I trust, you remember me as a fellow-traveller on your voyage from Japan to Chicago. I very much recall at this moment your views on the growth of the ascetic spirit in India... I recall these ideas in connection with my scheme of Research Institute of Science for India, of which you have doubtless heard or read."

Impressed by Vivekananda's views on science and leadership abilities, Tata wanted him to guide his campaign. Vivekananda endorsed the project with enthusiasm, and Tata, with the aim of advancing the scientific capabilities of the country, constituted a Provisional Committee to prepare a plan for setting up of an Institute of research and higher education. The committee presented a draft proposal to Lord Curzon on 31 December 1898. Subsequently, Sir William Ramsay, a Nobel Laureate, was called on to propose a suitable place for such an institution who suggested Bangalore as the best location.

The land and other facilities for the institution were donated on behalf of the State of Mysore by Krishna Raja Wadiyar IV, and Tata himself. Tata gave several buildings towards the creation of IISc. State of Mysore also contributed Rs 500000 towards capital expenditure and Rs 50000 for annual expense. The 7th Nizam of Hyderabad- Mir Osman Ali Khan also contributed which amounted to around 3 lakh Rupees over a period of 31 years.

The constitution of the institute was approved by the Viceroy, Lord Minto, and the necessary Vesting Order to enable it to function was signed on 27 May 1909. Early in 1911, the Maharaja of Mysore laid the foundation stone of the institute, and on 24 July, the first batch of students were admitted to the Departments of General and Applied Chemistry under Norman Rudolf and Electro-Technology under Alfred Hay. Within two months, the Department of Organic Chemistry was opened. In 1958 the institute was granted the deemed university status by the UGC.

At the time of the inception of IISc in 1909, Morris Travers, Sir William Ramsay's co-worker in the discovery of the noble gases, became its first Director. For Travers, this was a natural continuation of his work on the institute, since he had played a role in its founding. The first Indian Director was the Nobel Laureate Sir C.V. Raman.

The institute was the first to introduce Masters programs in Engineering. It has also started integrated doctoral programs in Biological, Chemical, Physical and Mathematical Sciences for natural science graduates.

In 2018, IISc was one of the first six institutes to be awarded the Institute of Eminence status. In 2019, IISc launched its brand statement: "Discover and Innovate; Transform and Transcend; Serve and Lead".

In 2022, IISc received a private donation of 425 crore Indian Rupees, the largest in its history to establish a postgraduate medical institute.

Bangalore Campus 
The IISc campus is located in the north of Bangalore, about 6 kilometers from Bangalore City Railway Station and Kempegowda Bus Station, on the way to Yeshwantpur. The institute is about 35 kilometers from Kempegowda International Airport. A number of other research institutes, Raman Research Institute, Indian Space Research Organisation (ISRO), Wood Research Institute and Central Power Research Institute (CPRI), are close to IISc. Most of these institutes are connected to IISc by a regular shuttle bus service. The campus houses more than 40 departments marked by routes such as the Gulmohar Marga, the Mahogany Marga, the Badami Marga, the Tala Marga, the Ashoka Marga, the Nilgiri Marg, the Silver Oak Marg, the Amra Marga and the Arjuna Marga. The institute is fully residential and is spread over 400 acres of land in the heart of Bangalore city. The campus features six canteens (cafeterias), a gymkhana (gymnasium and sports complex), a football ground and a cricket ground, five dining messes (halls), one multi cuisine restaurant, nine men's and five women's hostels (dormitories), an air strip, a library, two shopping centers and residences of the faculty members and other staff, besides other amenities.

The IISc campus harbors both exotic and indigenous plant species with about 110 species of woody plants. The roads on the campus are named after the dominant avenue tree species.

The architecture of the main building, which today houses the administration and the Faculty Hall, is classical in style, fronted by a grey, handsome tower. In front of it stands the work of Gilbert Bayes, a monument erected in the memory of J. N. Tata. At its feet is an inscription that serves to remind future generations of the generosity of Jamsetji Tata and the persistence with which he worked for the welfare of India. The building, as one of the prominent landmarks of Bangalore, was designed by C. F. Stevens and Company of Bombay in 1912–13.

The buildings for the metallurgy and aerospace departments were designed by the German architect Otto Königsberger in 1940.

Challakere Campus 
A second campus is in Challakere, on  lot of land. Infrastructure developed here includes the Talent Development Centre, Skill Development Centre funded by HAL under CSR Act, Solar Power Research Center and a Climate Observatory. The Centre for Sustainable Technologies has commenced its activities here under the project "C-BELT" i.e., the Centre for Bio-energy and Low-Carbon Technologies.

Janardhana Swamy, then Member of Parliament from the Chitradurga Lok Sabha as well as a notable alumnus of IISc and Amalan Biswas, then DC of Chitradurga District played significant roles in setting up the IISc's new campus at Challakere. They were instrumental in identifying all the required 1500 acres of land for the new campus, getting the existing building leased from the Sheep Farm, obtaining the various needed approvals from the government, and having the initial funds released from the State.

Organisation and administration

Academic divisions, departments, and centres
For academic purposes, departments and centres in the Institute are broadly assigned to either the Science Faculty or the Engineering Faculty. For administrative purposes (such as faculty recruitment, assessment and promotion), departments and centres are classified into six divisions, each headed by a chairperson. Each department or centre is administered by a chairperson.

 
The following centres are directly under the director (without a divisional chairman):
Autonomous Societies and Centres based in the Institute:

Academics

Academic programmes

Post-graduate (PG) Research Programmes

Research students constitute more than 60% of the students on the campus. PhD degrees offered in 40 different disciplines. Research programs leading to doctoral degrees are the main thrust in many departments. The program has a limited amount of course work, essentially to prepare the student to carry out the research, but the main emphasis is on the thesis work. The annual intake of research students is approximately 575 with several candidates sponsored from educational institutions and industries ( through External Registration Programme) .

The Integrated PhD program is designed to offer opportunities to 3-year BSc graduates for pursuing advanced research in areas of biological, chemical, mathematical, and physical Sciences, leading to the PhD degree.

Post-graduate (PG) Course Programmes 

The two-year MTech program is available in almost all engineering departments. Most MTech programs have a set of hard core courses specified as an essential requirement whereas students can take rest of the credits from many courses available in their parent or other departments and also do a dissertation work on the topic of their choice.

Master's degrees offered by the institute are classified into two categories: degrees by coursework (MTech, M.Mgt., and M.Des.) and degrees by research [MTech (research)].

The Department of Management Studies offers a Master of Management program exclusively for engineering graduates. The Center for Product Design and Manufacturing offers the Master of Design (M.Des.) course. Started in 1996, the M.Des. program is a two-year, full-time postgraduate program.

In keeping with India's recent National Education Policy (NEP 2020), IISc has launched the Master of Technology (Online) degree programme, a fully online programme, for practising engineers and scientists from academic year 2022–2023. The degree programme is for professionals who are sponsored by organisations, who already have a BE/BTech/Equivalent degree and wish to upskill or re-skill themselves in streams like Data Science and Business Analytics, Artificial Intelligence, Electronics and Communication Engineering.

Institute has recently announced MSc programme in life sciences and chemical sciences starting from academic year of 2022–23. These 2 years master's degree programs consist of foundational and flexible coursework and hands-on laboratory training. The design is aimed to develop experimental skills in advanced techniques for research, leading to an independent thesis research project. Students enrolled in the M Sc programs can personalize their coursework and research projects.

Under-graduate (UG) Programme 

An undergraduate programme in science for students after Class XII was conceived during the Centenary Celebrations in 2009. The first batch of students was admitted in 2011. The program offers a four-year Bachelor of Science (Research) and a five-year integrated Master of Science course in six disciplines: Biology, Chemistry, Environmental Science, Material Science, Mathematics, and Physics. The course aims at exposing the students to the inter-disciplinary nature in which scientific research is done in many upcoming fields.

A new undergraduate program BTech in Mathematics and Computing seeks to enter a niche area with the aim of producing future leaders who will be at the forefront of research, development, and innovation in futuristic disciplines and next generation technologies that require deep use of mathematics, computer science, and data science.

J. R. D. Tata Memorial Library

Apart from the main library, the institute also has independent departmental libraries. The library moved into the present premises in January 1965, built out of grants provided by University Grants Commission (UGC), in commemoration of the golden jubilee celebrations of the Institute in 1959. In 1995, the library was renamed as "J. R. D. Tata Memorial Library". The National Board for Higher Mathematics (NBHM) has recognised this library as Regional Center for Mathematics for the south region and continued to award a special grant towards subscription of Journals in Mathematics.

The annual budget of the library is over Rs. 100 million (almost US$2,500,000) of which subscription towards periodicals alone is about Rs. 90 million. The library currently receives over 1,734 periodical titles, of which 1381 are subscribed, while the remaining titles are received as gratis or on an exchange basis. About 600 titles are accessible through the library subscription. In addition, over 10,000 journals are accessible online, thanks to INDEST subscription. The total holdings of the library exceed 411,000 documents.

Central computing facility
The Computer Centre, established in 1970 as a central computing facility, became Supercomputer Education and Research Centre (SERC) in 1990 to provide computing facility to the faculty and students of the institute. SERC was created and fully funded by the Ministry of Human Resource Development (MHRD), Government of India to commemorate the platinum jubilee of the institute. It houses India's first petascale supercomputer Cray XC40, the erstwhile fastest supercomputer in India.

Apart from functioning as a central computing facility of IISc, the SERC is engaged in education and research programs in areas relating to supercomputer development and application.  The centre is also involved in several sponsored research projects in collaboration with several high-profile government and private agencies.

Academic and industrial collaborations

The Indian Institute of Science collaborates with various government organisations like the Indian Ordnance Factories, DRDO, the ISRO, Bharat Electronics Limited, Aeronautical Development Agency, National Aerospace Laboratories, CSIR, Department of IT (Government of India), Centre for Development of Advanced Computing, etc. IISc also works in collaboration with private industry and research labs. A few organisations have been incubated by the Society for Innovation and Development (SID) on campus, including Morphing Machines and SandI, while Gamma Porite is currently under incubation. IISc actively promotes and supports ventures by the faculty, the students and alumni. Strand Life Sciences and Ittiam are some success stories of this initiative. In March 2016, a science start-up, incubated at the IISc, built the world's first food-grade DNA/RNA stain. This might cut the time taken to diagnose conditions such as HIV to a day, from 45 days at present.

Rankings

IISc had ranked 1st in 2022 in terms of citations per faculty by QS World University Rankings, moreover IISc had ranked 2nd consistently for more than 5 years among all universities around the world in terms of citations per faculty. IISc was ranked 301–350 in the world by the Times Higher Education World University Rankings in 2021, the top institute in India, as well as 36th in the 2020 Asia University Rankings. The 2021 QS World University Rankings ranked IISc 185th in the world, as well as 51 in Asia University Rankings and 10th among BRICS nations. In 2020, it is ranked 530th among the universities around the world by SCImago Institutions Rankings. 
The Academic Ranking of World Universities ranked it 401–500 in the world in 2020. 
It was ranked top university in India by the National Institutional Ranking Framework university ranking for 2021. It was also ranked first in India in the newly introduced research category for 2021.

Campus life

Events
Pravega is the annual science, technology and cultural festival of Indian Institute of Science, Bangalore. Started in 2013 by the undergraduates of IISc, the fest is usually held on the third weekend of January.
Vijyoshi, an annual national science camp for secondary school and undergraduate students, is hosted by IISc.

IISc also has active sports teams, major ones being in cricket, football, badminton and volleyball. They participate each year in the IISM (inter IISER sports meet) and a number of other tournaments and events.

Alumni associations
IISc has a parent alumni association (AA) in Bangalore and several branches elsewhere including USA (IISCAANA). Of recent parent association is involved in several disputes. One of the reasons appears to be efforts by some to allow Non-IISc degree holders to become a part of the AA. Similar situation is created in IISCAANA
by allowing several non-IISc members to be active in the team. IIScAANA allows those who did not complete degree to become members by adding a clause
'completed at least one semester of course work in IISc' for membership eligibility.

December 2005 terror attack

On 28 December 2005, two terrorists started firing indiscriminately inside the IISc campus. Munish Chander Puri, a professor from IIT Delhi, died in the attack. Four others were injured.

Noted people

Notable alumni

Notable faculty

Two former directors, C. V. Raman and C. N. R. Rao, have been awarded India's highest civilian honour Bharat Ratna. Four former directors, Sir A. G. Bourne, Sir Martin O. Forster, C. V. Raman and J. C. Ghosh, have been knighted. Among the IISc alumni, there are three Rhodes Scholars, several Fellows of the Royal Society, and thousands of members of Indian and foreign Academy of Sciences. Hundreds of IISc faculty members have also received the Shanti Swarup Bhatnagar Prize for Science and Technology awarded to Indians who have made outstanding contributions under 45 years of age. In spite of these achievements, no alumnus or serving faculty member of IISc has won either a Nobel Prize or a Fields Medal, although C. V. Raman did win a Nobel Prize before becoming the institute's first Indian director.

See also
 Indian Institutes of Technology
 Tata Institute of Fundamental Research
 National Institute of Science Education and Research
 Indian Institutes of Science Education and Research
 Mobile Robotics Laboratory at IISc
 List of universities in India
 List of autonomous higher education institutes in India
 DoMS, Indian Institute of Science
 Open access in India

References

External links

 

 
IISc
Engineering colleges in Bangalore
Research institutes in India
Research institutes in Bangalore
Multidisciplinary research institutes
Tata institutions
Kingdom of Mysore
Educational institutions established in 1909
Engineering universities and colleges in India
1909 establishments in India
Deemed universities in Karnataka